Atlantic Boulevard, consisting mostly of State Road 814 (SR 814), is a major commercial and commuter highway in northern Broward County, Florida. The  divided highway extends from the Sawgrass Expressway in Coral Springs to State Road A1A in Pompano Beach. It serves as the latitudinal baseline for the street grid for the city of Pompano Beach. The portion of the boulevard west of U.S. Route 441 is locally maintained as County Road 814.

Route description

County Road 814
Atlantic Boulevard begins its eastward journey from the Sawgrass Expressway in Coral Springs. The road meanders through residential zones before it arrives at its intersection with University Drive, where Coral Square is located. Afterward, SR 814 borders the former CDP of Ramblewood East. Ramblewood Middle School is located there,  from the SR 817 intersection. The road continues eastward, passing by apartment buildings and a golf course before its intersection with US 441 (SR 7) in Margate.

Conflicting signage on Atlantic Boulevard does not clearly show the location of SR 814's western terminus. County Road 814 shields still exist at the US 441 intersection, but State Road 814 shields were erected at the Sawgrass Expressway interchange upon the exit's opening. In 2009, overhead signs were erected at the intersection of University Drive and Atlantic Boulevard, which designate the road as County Road 814. The official FDOT county highway map also shows SR 814's western terminus and CR 814's eastern terminus located at US 441. There are similar conflicts with other east-west roads which terminate at the Sawgrass Expressway; however, there are no County Road shields present on those roads, and they are thus unsigned.

State Road 814
SR 814 begins at US 441, and has an intersection with Lyons Road, another major north-south corridor,  later. Soon after, the road accesses an interchange with Florida's Turnpike south. Drivers who wish to take Florida's Turnpike north are directed to SR 849, the extension of Atlantic Boulevard. After the interchange with the Turnpike, SR 814 enters Pompano Beach, where the road becomes the latitudinal baseline for the city's street grid. Soon after, SR 814 intersects Andrews Avenue (which has the hidden designation of County Road 811A) and Interstate 95, followed by Florida State Road 811 (Dixie Highway. The intersection with Dixie Highway is the center of Pompano Beach's street grid. Immediately paralleling Dixie Highway is the Florida East Coast Railway, which carries the Brightline service. One block north of Atlantic Boulevard is the site of a proposed Tri-Rail station.

Afterward, SR 814 has one more major intersection with US 1 (Federal Highway) before its eastern terminus at SR A1A (Ocean Boulevard), just before the Atlantic Ocean.

History
From 1945 until the early 1970s, all of Hammondville Road (State Road 912) was the original State Road 814, which continued eastward to State Road A1A on Atlantic Boulevard after a short zigzag involving North Dixie Highway (State Road 811).  From the early 1970s to about 1983, State Road 814 between Florida's Turnpike and Dixie Highway was rerouted along the entirety of Atlantic Boulevard.  This alignment of State Road 814 lasted about a decade, before the western end of State Road 814 was rerouted onto a westward extension of Atlantic Boulevard.  The north–south section along Northwest 31 Avenue was redesignated State Road 849 by Florida Department of Transportation, and Hammondville Road became Coconut Creek Parkway (State Road 912).  Around the year 2000, State Road 912 was returned to Broward County control and converted to County Road 912. In 2016, Atlantic Boulevard east of Blanche Ely Avenue was transferred to the City of Pompano Beach, with the exception of the S.C. Fox Memorial Bridge, along with SR 811 within the city limits, in exchange for a $4,562,065 fee paid by FDOT.

Major intersections

References

External links

814
814
814
Boulevards in the United States